The 2004 Ireland rugby union tour of South Africa was a series of matches played in June 2004 in South Africa by Ireland national rugby union team.

Ireland travelled to South Africa in June 2004, having won their first Triple Crown since 1985, and beaten the champions of the 2003 Rugby World Cup, England in their first home game since the final. As a result, the Irish manager, Eddie O'Sullivan, was confident that Ireland would achieve their first win over South Africa in 39 years, their only previous victory having come in Dublin in 1965.

By contrast, South Africa had just changed their coach to Jake White and he had radically changed the team for his first test since taking charge of the Springboks. The first of the two game test series was played at altitude in Bloemfontein and South Africa eventually won the match 31–17, despite the scores being level at 11-all at half time.

The second match was played in the Newlands Stadium in Cape Town, and was a closer affair. However, South Africa maintained their unbeaten record against Ireland on home soil by winning 26–17.

Matches

South Africa: 15.Gaffie du Toit, 14.Breyton Paulse, 13.Marius Joubert, 12.Wayne Julies, 11.Henno Mentz, 10.Jaco van der Westhuyzen, 9.Fourie du Preez, 8.Jacques Cronjé, 7.Pedrie Wannenburg, 6.Schalk Burger , 5.Victor Matfield, 4.Bakkies Botha, 3.Eddie Andrews, 2.John Smit (capt.), 1.Os du Randt,  – replacements: 17.CJ van der Linde, 18.Quinton Davids, 19.Gerrie Britz       –  No entry : 16.Hanyani Shimange, 19.Gerrie Britz, 20.Bolla Conradie, 21.Jaque Fourie, 22.Brent Russell
Ireland: 15.Girvan Dempsey, 14.Shane Horgan, 13.Brian O'Driscoll (capt.), 12.Gordon D'Arcy, 11.Geordan Murphy, 10.Ronan O'Gara, 9.Peter Stringer, 8.Anthony Foley, 7.David Wallace, 6.Simon Easterby, 5.Paul O'Connell, 4.Malcolm O'Kelly, 3.John Hayes, 2.Shane Byrne, 1.Reggie Corrigan,  – replacements: 16.Frankie Sheahan, 17.Marcus Horan, 19.Alan Quinlan, 22.Kevin Maggs      –  No entry: 18.Donncha O'Callaghan, 20.Guy Easterby, 21.David Humphreys

South Africa: 15.Percy Montgomery, 14.Breyton Paulse, 13.Marius Joubert, 12.Wayne Julies , 11.Jaque Fourie, 10.Jaco van der Westhuyzen, 9.Fourie du Preez, 8.Jacques Cronjé, 7.Pedrie Wannenburg, 6.Schalk Burger, 5.Victor Matfield, 4.Quinton Davids, 3.Eddie Andrews, 2.John Smit (capt.), 1.Os du Randt,  – replacements: 17.CJ van der Linde, 18.Geo Cronjé, 19.Gerrie Britz, 22.Brent Russell      –  No entry : 16.Hanyani Shimange, 20.Bolla Conradie, 21.Gaffie du Toit
Ireland: 15.Girvan Dempsey, 14.Shane Horgan, 13.Brian O'Driscoll (capt.), 12.Kevin Maggs, 11.Tyrone Howe, 10.Ronan O'Gara, 9.Peter Stringer, 8.Anthony Foley, 7.David Wallace, 6.Simon Easterby, 5.Paul O'Connell, 4.Malcolm O'Kelly, 3.John Hayes, 2.Shane Byrne, 1.Reggie Corrigan ,  – replacements: 16.Frankie Sheahan, 17.Marcus Horan, 18.Alan Quinlan, 19.Donncha O'Callaghan, 20.Guy Easterby, 21.David Humphreys, 22.Gavin Duffy

Touring party

Manager: Eddie O'Sullivan 
Captain: Brian O'Driscoll

Backs

Forwards

See also
 Ireland vs South Africa at rugby union

References

Ireland national rugby union team tours
Rugby union tours of South Africa
Ireland tour
Ire
tour